Symbrenthia, commonly called jesters, is a butterfly genus in the family Nymphalidae found south-eastern Asia

Species
In alphabetical order:
 Symbrenthia anna Semper, 1888
 Symbrenthia brabira Moore, 1872
 Symbrenthia doni (Tytler, 1940) – Tytler's jester
 Symbrenthia hippalus C. & R. Felder, 1867
 Symbrenthia hippoclus (Cramer, 1779) – common jester 
 Symbrenthia hypatia (Wallace, 1869)
 Symbrenthia hypselis (Godart, 1824) – Himalayan jester, spotted jester
 Symbrenthia hysudra Moore, 1874
 Symbrenthia intricata Fruhstorfer, 1897
 Symbrenthia javanus Staudinger, 1897
 Symbrenthia lilaea (Hewitson, 1864) – common jester
 Symbrenthia niphanda Moore, 1872 – bluetail jester
 Symbrenthia platena Staudinger, 1897
 Symbrenthia silana de Nicéville, 1885 – scarce jester
 Symbrenthia sinoides Hall, 1935
 Symbrenthia viridilunulata Huang & Xue, 2004

References

Nymphalini
Butterfly genera
Taxa named by Jacob Hübner